Lourenzá is a municipality in Lugo province in Galicia in northwest Spain.

It is the site of the monastery of San Salvador. The façade of its church is said to have been a prototype for that of Santiago de Compostela Cathedral. 

Municipalities in the Province of Lugo